Frank Ollivier (1845 – 19 May 1918) was a New Zealand cricketer. He played in one first-class match for Canterbury in 1867/68.

See also
 List of Canterbury representative cricketers

References

External links
 

1845 births
1918 deaths
New Zealand cricketers
Canterbury cricketers
People from Hammersmith